Autoroute 73 (or A-73)  is an autoroute in Quebec, Canada. Following a northwest-southeast axis perpendicular to the Saint Lawrence River, the A-73 provides an important freeway link with regions north and south of Quebec City, the capital of the province. It also intersects with Autoroute 20 (south of the river) and Autoroute 40 (north of the river) - one of only three Quebec autoroutes to do so. The A-73 begins less than 40 kilometres from the U.S. border in Quebec's Beauce region, traverses metropolitan Quebec City, and ends in the Laurentian Mountains. Civic, political, and business leaders in regions north and south of the A-73's termini have lobbied the Quebec government to extend the autoroute. While the four-laning of Route 175 to Saguenay has alleviated concerns in the north about safety and connectivity, Quebecers in the Beauce continue to advocate for extending the A-73 to the U.S. border, towards the Armstrong–Jackman Border Crossing and U.S. Route 201 within Maine.

Description

Autoroute Robert-Cliche
The southernmost section of the A-73 is named in honour of Robert Cliche. A lawyer, politician, and judge from Quebec's Beauce region, Cliche also served as head of the Quebec branch of the New Democratic Party.

The A-73 begins at a roundabout junction with Route 204 in Saint-Georges, tracing the course of the Chaudière River to its junction with Autoroute 20 in Lévis. Along the way, the A-73 connects the largest cities and towns in Quebec's historic Beauce region. Exit numbers on the A-73 begin at km 43 (which accounts for an as-yet unbuilt section to the Maine border). Initially, much of the A-73 south of the Saint Lawrence River was built as a super-two (one lane in each direction) highway with no median. Work to expand the autoroute to four lanes was completed in 2016. Motorists wishing to continue southward to Maine must currently travel on Route 173, a two-lane highway.

Approaching metropolitan Quebec City, the A-73 meets the A-20 (co-signed as a section of the Trans-Canada Highway) at an interchange just south of the Saint Lawrence River. From here, motorists can take the A-20 east to Rivière-du-Loup, Rimouski, and the Gaspé Peninsula; and west to Montreal, Toronto, and Ottawa (via the A-40 and Ontario Highway 417).

The A-73 crosses the Saint Lawrence via the Pierre Laporte Bridge—the longest suspension bridge in Canada.

Autoroute Henri-IV
North of the river, the A-73 is named for Henri IV (Henri-Quatre), King of France at the time of the city of Québec's founding in 1608.

The A-73 provides a partial beltway around metropolitan Quebec to the west and north of the central city. At kilometre 134, the A-73 intersects with the A-540, a spur route connecting the A-73 and A-40 with the approach to Jean-Lesage International Airport.

At kilometre 139, the A-73 meets the A-40 and A-440. From here, motorists can take the A-40 west to Trois-Rivières and Montreal, or the A-440 east to Quebec City centre.

Autoroute Félix Leclerc
Once co-signed with the A-40, the A-73 assumes the name assigned to the A-40. Leclerc was a singer-songwriter, poet, writer, actor and political activist.

The A-73/40 continues north for three kilometres to a junction with Autoroute 573, a spur route that provides access to the CFB Valcartier military base. At this intersection, the A-73/40 exit the autoroute, which continues as the A-573. From here, the A-73/40 continues due east, bypassing Quebec City to the north. Whereas the A-73/40 uses A-73 distance-based exit numbers prior to the junction with the A-573, past this point, A-40 distance based exit numbers are used. (This anomaly reflects an unbuilt section of the A-40, which would have started at Saint-Augustin-de-Desmaures, bypassed Jean-Lesage Airport to the north, and connected with the present-day A-73/40 at the A-573 interchange.)

The A-73/40 intersects with the A-740 (a spur route connecting Quebec City with the northern suburbs) at exit 310.

At exit 313, A-73 exits the autoroute at a clovermill interchange. North of the junction, the A-73 continues through Quebec City's northern suburbs. South of the junction, the autoroute is signed as Autoroute 973. The A-973 is a spur route which terminates just north of Quebec City centre. The A-40 continues eastward for another ten kilometres to a terminus with the A-440 just east of the city centre.

Autoroute Laurentienne
The most northerly section of the A-73 is named for the  Laurentian Mountains, a popular destination for outdoor sports north of Quebec City.

After the split with the A-40, the A-73 enters the foothills of the Laurentians. The autoroute provides access to the Stoneham Mountain Resort at kilometre 167 and bypasses Stoneham and Tewkesbury to the east. This stretch is cosigned with Route 175. The A-73 ends at kilometre 182, with a final exit at Boulevard Talbot in Stoneham. The road continues as Route 175, which provides a link between Quebec City and the Saguenay-Lac-Saint-Jean region to the north.

Future

Chaudière-Appalaches
Community leaders continue to press for Transports Québec to extend the A-73 south to the Maine border. The issue resurfaced during a 2015 by-elections in Beauce-Sud, when Coalition Avenir Québec leader François Legault announced his support for extending the A-73 to Maine as a priority for his party if elected. For its part, Maine continues to debate private financing, construction, and operation of a proposed East-West Highway linking Quebec with the Maritime Provinces, possibly through Calais, Maine, very near where New Brunswick Route 1 has had its western terminus since October 2012. The proposed route, however, would involve connecting with an extended section of Autoroute 10, not the A-73, with the Autoroute 10 crossing some 57 km (35 mi) southwest of it. Maine currently has no plans to convert U.S. Route 201 to Interstate standards, which would provide an all-freeway connection from Quebec City to Interstate 95.

Capitale-Nationale
Between 2003 and 2013, the governments of Quebec and Canada co-funded reconstruction of Route 175 into a partially-controlled access freeway between the end of A-73 in Stoneham and the junction with the A-70 in Saguenay. This prompted speculation that the A-73 designation would be extended further northward into the Saguenay-Lac-Saint-Jean region. As the reconstructed Route 175 is not fully a controlled-access highway, it does not meet Autoroute design standards. Thus, A-73's terminus remains at Stoneham unless and until corresponding sections of Route 175 are upgraded to controlled-access freeway.  Quebec Autoroute 70 remains the only autoroute in Quebec that does not directly connect to any other.

Exit list

References

External links

 A-73 at Quebec Autoroutes
 A-73 extension unofficial website
 Transports Quebec Map 
 Building Canada infrastructure plan for A-73

73